The intermediate station General Santander is part of the TransMilenio mass-transit system of Bogotá, Colombia, opened in the year 2000.

Location

The station is located in southern Bogotá, specifically on Avenida NQS south of the Avenida Batallón Caldas bridge.

History

In October 2005, phase two of the TransMilenio opened from Calle 92 with Autopista Norte to General Santander.

The station receives its name due to the proximity of the police school located a few blocks away.

The station is the only one in the system located in three localities of Bogotá. The supports for the  pedestrian bridge on the north side are located in Puente Aranda, while the supports for the southern bridge are located in Rafael Uribe Uribe. The transfer point for the feeder routes is located in Antonio Nariño.

Station Services

In 2006, began functioning as an intermediate station, serving both main-line buses and feeder routes.

Old trunk services

Main line service

Feeder routes

The station has connections to the following feeder route:

Fátima loop

Inter-city service

This station does not have inter-city service.

External links
TransMilenio
 Opening of the line from eltiempo.com
 Problemas en la inauguración de la troncal Autopista Sur en eltiempo.com

See also 
Bogotá
TransMilenio
List of TransMilenio stations

TransMilenio